Jozef Špaur's Stadium is a home football stadium in Ružiná, Slovakia. It serves as home stadium for football club MFK Lokomotíva Zvolen. The stadium has a capacity of 1,200 (500 seats).

External links 
Stadium website 

Football venues in Slovakia
Buildings and structures in Banská Bystrica Region
Sport in Banská Bystrica Region